Northeast Lancaster Township Historic District, locally known as School Lane Hills, is a national historic district located at Lancaster Township, Lancaster County, Pennsylvania. The district includes 183 contributing buildings and is almost exclusively residential.  The oldest buildings date to about 1820 and include Wheatland and the Herr House. The majority of the residences were built between 1920 and 1939, and include notable examples of the  Colonial Revival, Tudor Revival, and American Foursquare architectural styles.

It was listed on the National Register of Historic Places in 1986.

References

Historic districts on the National Register of Historic Places in Pennsylvania
Colonial Revival architecture in Pennsylvania
Tudor Revival architecture in Pennsylvania
Historic districts in Lancaster County, Pennsylvania
National Register of Historic Places in Lancaster County, Pennsylvania